The 40th Legislative Assembly of Ontario was a legislature of the government of the province of Ontario, Canada. The membership was set by the 2011 Ontario general election.

It was controlled by a Liberal Party minority. The government was led by Premier Dalton McGuinty until his resignation resulted in the 2013 leadership election, which selected Kathleen Wynne as his successor. Wynne is the first woman ever to serve as Premier of Ontario.

The Official Opposition was the Progressive Conservative Party, led by Tim Hudak, and the third party was the New Democrats, led by Andrea Horwath.

On May 2, 2014, Premier of Ontario Kathleen Wynne announced that she had formally requested that Lieutenant Governor of Ontario David Onley dissolve the 40th Legislative Assembly of Ontario and call a provincial general election to occur on June 12, 2014.

Timeline of the 40th Parliament of Ontario
November 21, 2011 – Dave Levac (Liberal, Brant) is elected Speaker on the second ballot defeating three other candidates.
November 22, 2011 – Speech from the Throne is delivered.
March 29, 2012: Finance Minister Dwight Duncan delivers the provincial budget.
April 23, 2012: After negotiations between the Liberals and the NDP, the minority government agrees to amend the budget by adding $242 million to child care funding, $20 million for northern and rural hospitals, increase welfare and disability benefits by 1 per cent at a cost of $55 million, and add a 2% surtax on the portion of individual income that exceeds $500,000 a year.
April 24, 2012: Budget approved 52–37 with NDP MPPs abstaining.
April 27, 2012: Progressive Conservative MPP Elizabeth Witmer (Kitchener—Waterloo) resigns her seat upon accepting a government appointment as chair of the Workplace Safety & Insurance Board. The vacancy results in the government and Opposition being tied in seats, however, as Speaker David Levac is a Liberal, the Opposition continues to have a one-seat advantage. A Liberal victory in this pending by-election and in the pending Vaughan by-election would give it a majority in the legislature.
August 1, 2012: Liberal MPP Greg Sorbara (Vaughan) resigns his seat.
September 6, 2012: By-elections held in the ridings of Kitchener—Waterloo and Vaughan. Catherine Fife (NDP) elected as MPP for Kitchener—Waterloo. Steven Del Duca (Liberal) elected as MPP for Vaughan. The NDP gains one seat in the Ontario Legislature while the Liberals retain their 53-seat minority.
October 15, 2012: Premier McGuinty prorogues the legislature and announces his resignation as Liberal Party leader pending a leadership convention.
 February 11, 2013: Kathleen Wynne is sworn in as Premier, and a new cabinet in sworn in.
 February 14, 2013: Chris Bentley and Dwight Duncan, Liberal MPPs for London West and Windsor—Tecumseh, resign.
 June 11, 2013: Passage of the Wynne government's first budget, with the support of the NDP; legislature recesses for the summer.
 June 12, 2013: Former Premier Dalton McGuinty resigns his Ottawa South seat.
 June 27, 2013: Liberal MPP Margarett Best (Scarborough—Guildwood) resigns her seat.
 July 2, 2013: Minister of Intergovernmental Affairs Laurel Broten (Etobicoke—Lakeshore) resigns from Cabinet and her seat.
 August 1, 2013: Five by-elections held to replace retiring Liberals. Results were two Liberals, two NDP, one Conservative.
 September 24, 2013: Kim Craitor, Liberal MPP for Niagara Falls, resigns his seat.
 December 31, 2013: Peter Shurman, Progressive Conservative MPP for Thornhill, resigns his seat.
 February 13, 2014: Two by-elections held to replace vacant Niagara Falls and Thornhill seats. Result is a Progressive Conservative hold in Thornhill and an NDP gain in Niagara Falls.
 March 25, 2014: Resignation of cabinet member Linda Jeffrey to run for mayor of Brampton causes a cabinet shuffle.
 May 2, 2014: The 40th Parliament of Ontario was dissolved as Wynne calls an election, to be held June 12, 2014.

Seating Plan

List of members

Membership changes

Sessions
There were two sessions of the 40th Legislature.

References

External links
 Legislative Assembly of Ontario. 

Terms of the Legislative Assembly of Ontario
2011 establishments in Ontario
2014 disestablishments in Ontario
 Minority governments